Wang Xinyu (born 26 September 2001) is a Chinese tennis player. On 27 February 2023, Wang reached a career-high singles ranking of world No. 65. On 12 September 2022, she peaked at world No. 87 in the doubles rankings.

Coaching team
Wang's current team consists of her father Wang Peng; a Serbian technical coach, Aleksandar Slović, who won the men's singles title at 2009 Summer Universiade and once trained with Novak Djokovic when young; a fitness coach Miro Hrvatin from Croatia; and a Chinese physio from Nanjing. With the help of Slović, Wang was able to train with a few Serbian players abroad. She currently trains at the Tennis & Badminton Centre of the Shenzhen Sports Centre.

Personal life
Wang was born in Shenzhen, Guangdong. Her father, Wang Peng (born in Hangzhou, Zhejiang), is a former head coach of the Shenzhen tennis team and the Chinese women's national tennis team, but resigned from the latter to concentrate on his daughter's tennis career. Her mother was a former player in the Zhejiang women's basketball team. Both of them have devoted themselves to accompanying Wang everywhere. Wang showed great enthusiasm for tennis from early childhood and, coached by her father, she started playing properly at the age of five.

Junior career
Junior Grand Slam results - Singles:

 Australian Open: SF (2018)
 French Open: 3R (2017, 2018)
 Wimbledon: SF (2018)
 US Open: 2R (2017)

Junior Grand Slam results - Doubles:

 Australian Open: W (2018)
 French Open: 2R (2017)
 Wimbledon: W (2018)
 US Open: SF (2017)

Tennis career

2017: Grand Slam debut
Wang booked her ticket to a Grand Slam debut in the 2018 Australian Open on 3 December 2017 in Zhuhai, by winning the Asia-Pacific Wildcard Playoff, coming back to edge out the Papua New Guinean No. 1, Abigail Tere-Apisah, in the final. Tere-Apisah was only two points away from victory when leading 5–3, 30–0 in the second set, looking to become the first player from Papua New Guinea to compete in a Grand Slam main draw, when momentum shifted and Wang, demonstrating fearlessness for her age, won the next seven points before going on to level the match. Wang eventually won the match in three sets, seizing the most crucial break with a splendid backhand passing shot in the ninth game, and then closed out the final set after saving four break points. “It's probably the most important day in my life so far,” Wang said in the post-match news conference to CCTV Sports Channel, the official TV broadcaster of the Australian Open in China. At the age of 16, she was the youngest Chinese player to make a Grand Slam main draw.

2018: First Junior Grand Slam champion
At the Australian Open, as the second youngest competitor in the main draw (just older than 15-year-old Marta Kostyuk), Wang lost her debut Grand Slam match to Alizé Cornet, in straight sets. But going through to the junior girls' doubles final with her partner Liang En-shuo from Taiwan, Wang claimed the title in a close match against Violet Apisah of Papua New Guinea (Abigail Tere-Apisah's niece) and Lulu Sun, a New Zealand-born Swiss player of Chinese descent.

2019: First WTA Tour doubles title
In September, Wang reached her first WTA Tour-level final at the Jiangxi International Open in doubles event. Alongside Zhu Lin, she defeated compatriots Peng Shuai and Zhang Shuai.

2020-2021: Top 100 debut in singles
She made her debut in the top 100, after reaching the quarterfinal of the Ladies Linz at world No. 99 in the year-end rankings, on 15 November 2021. However, she lost to the eventual champion Alison Riske.

2022: First Grand Slam match win and top 75 in singles, top 100 in doubles
Wang won her first Grand Slam match of her career which was against Ann Li and was defeated in the second round at the Australian Open by World No. 2, Aryna Sabalenka.

She made her top 100 debut in doubles, on 25 April 2022, and top 75 in singles, on 16 May 2022 after winning her biggest title on the ITF World Tennis Tour at the $100k La Bisbal d’Emporda in Spain.

Performance timelines

Only main-draw results in WTA Tour, Grand Slam tournaments, Fed Cup/Billie Jean King Cup and Olympic Games are included in win–loss records.

Singles
Current after the 2023 Monterrey Open.

Doubles
Current after the 2023 Australian Open.

WTA career finals

Doubles: 6 (2 titles, 4 runner-ups)

WTA Challenger finals

Singles: 1 (runner-up)

Doubles: 1 (title)

ITF Circuit finals

Singles: 11 (6 titles, 5 runner-ups)

Doubles: 5 (2 titles, 3 runner-ups)

Junior Grand Slam finals

Doubles: 2 (2 titles)

Head-to-head record

Record against top 10 players
Wang's record against players who have been ranked in the top 10. Active players are in boldface.

Notes

References

External links
 
  

2001 births
Living people
Sportspeople from Shenzhen
Chinese female tennis players
Australian Open (tennis) junior champions
Wimbledon junior champions
Tennis players at the 2018 Summer Youth Olympics
Tennis players from Guangdong
Grand Slam (tennis) champions in girls' doubles
21st-century Chinese women